Linwu County is a county in Hunan Province, China, it is under the administration of the prefecture-level city of Chenzhou.

Located on the southern margin of the province, it is adjacent to the southwest of the city proper in Chenzhou. The county is bordered to the north by Guiyang and Jiahe Counties, to the northeast by Beihu District, to the east by Yizhang County, to the south by Lianzhou City of Guangdong, to the west by Lanshan County. The county has nine towns and four townships under its jurisdiction, the county seat is Shunfeng Town.

Administrative divisions
9 towns
 Chujiang
 Fenshi
 Huaxiang
 Jinjiang
 Maishi
 Nanqiang
 Shuidong
 Shunfeng
 Wushui

3 townships
 Huatang
 Wanshui
 Zhennan

1 ethnic township
 Yao Xishan

Climate

References
www.xzqh.org

External links 

 
County-level divisions of Hunan
Geography of Chenzhou